David Leung Cheuk-yin  (born on 15 December 1966) is a Hong Kong barrister and Senior Counsel, as well as the sixth and current Director of Public Prosecutions of Hong Kong, but will stand down at the end of 2020.

Early life and career 
He was educated at the University of Hong Kong, before becoming a solicitor in 1992. He joined the Prosecutions Division of the Department of Justice in 1995, and subsequently was called to the Hong Kong Bar in 1998 and held a number of senior roles in the Division, including serving as Deputy Director of Public Prosecutions in 2012. He became a Senior Counsel in 2015.

Director of Public Prosecutions 
On 29 December 2017, David Leung - Lương Trách-nhiên became Director of Public Prosecutions. He was described by Rimsky Yuen, SC, Hong Kong's third Secretary for Justice, as “the in-house expert on the law relating to public order events … and cost matters”. Leung was involved in a number of high-profile prosecutions, including those around the 2014 Hong Kong protests, 2016 Mong Kok civil unrest, and the legality of Uber's operation in Hong Kong.

In July 2020, Leung quit as DPP, citing differences with his boss, Justice Secretary Teresa Cheng. Despite leading some prosecutions, he was seen by pro-Beijing politicians and the police as being too cautious to charge some protesters. He was expected to remain in the role until 31 December 2020.

Controversy

District Court trial 
In mid 2005, Leung was sued by university classmate and barrister Kevin Hon, with the trial lasting 8 days across 3 months in front of District Court Judge Marlene Ng May-ling (now a High Court Judge). During judgement in 2006, Judge Ng commented that Leung was "unconvincing", that she was "not persuaded that Leung's contention is reliable", and that his reasoning was a "poor attempt to justify his repudiatory decision to unilaterally pull out of the Investment". The case number was DCCJ3619/2002; Leung lost and was ordered to pay over HK$400,000 in damages to Hon. Leung did not appeal the case.

2019–20 Hong Kong Protests 
In August 2019, a group of "at least 5" prosecutors (of which Leung is head) alleged that he had been "trampled" by the Secretary for Justice Teresa Cheng and failed in his gatekeeping role. They said that he often only gave prepared answers to media when responding to controversial issues and did not stabilize the morale of prosecutors.

Also in August 2019, a group of 3000 legal sector workers led by Dennis Kwok, and including legal heavyweights such as Denis Chang QC SC, demanded a face-to-face meeting with Cheng and Leung over alleged politically motivated prosecutions.

In September 2019, William Wong, the Chairman of the Court Prosecutors Association, wrote to Cheng and Leung and urged them to speak out against allegedly political arrests by the police.

On 31 July 2020, a recent email from Leung to his colleagues became public in which he said that he had tendered his resignation. In the email, Leung revealed that he had been sidelined by Secretary of Justice Teresa Cheng in matters of the national security law.

Personal life 
Leung's wife is also a senior prosecutor.

References 

Living people
Place of birth missing (living people)
Hong Kong Senior Counsel
Alumni of the University of Hong Kong
Barristers of Hong Kong
Hong Kong legal professionals
1966 births